Richard Bingham, 2nd Earl of Lucan (4 December 1764 – 30 June 1839), styled The Honourable from 1776 to 1795 and subsequently Lord Bingham until 1799, was an Irish peer and Tory politician.

Background
He was the only son of Charles Bingham, 1st Earl of Lucan, and his wife Margaret Smith, daughter of Sir James Smith. Bingham was educated at The Royal College of St Peter in Westminster and Christ Church, Oxford. In 1799, he succeeded his father as earl.

Career
Bingham entered the British House of Commons for St Albans in 1790, representing the constituency until 1800. After the Act of Union in the following year, he sat as representative peer in the House of Lords from 1802 until his death in 1839.

Family
On 26 May 1794, he married Lady Elizabeth Belasyse, third daughter of Henry Belasyse, 2nd Earl Fauconberg and former wife of Bernard Howard, 12th Duke of Norfolk, and had by her five daughters and two sons. They separated in 1804. Bingham died, aged 74 at his residence at Serpentine Terrace, Knightsbridge and was succeeded in his titles by his older son George. His second son Richard Camden Bingham was a diplomat. His eldest daughter, Elizabeth, married George Harcourt.

He was acquainted with the novelist Jane Austen, who in a letter dated 8 February 1807 reported that "Lord Lucan has taken a mistress."

References

1764 births
1839 deaths
Alumni of Christ Church, Oxford
British MPs 1790–1796
British MPs 1796–1800
Irish representative peers
Members of the Parliament of Great Britain for English constituencies
People educated at Westminster School, London
Politicians from County Mayo
Members of the Irish House of Lords
Richard
Bingham Baronets, of Castlebar